Sfinx can refer to:
 Another word for Sphinx, such as the mythological creature, the Great Sphinx of Giza, or the Sphinx of Bucegi
 The acronym SFINX, for Service for French Internet Exchange
 Sfinx (band), a Romanian rock band
 Sphynx cat, a cat breed
 Pseudonym for the Norwegian author Edle Hartmann

See also
Sphinx (disambiguation)